PJ Katie's Farm was a Canadian children's television series featuring the live action manipulation of Crayola Model Magic figures and was hosted/narrated/acted/voiced/improvised by actress Jennifer Racicot as PJ Katie.

The series was originally developed from interstitial segments on YTV's preschool block, The Treehouse, before becoming its own series in 1995. The show also aired on the separate Treehouse TV channel in 1999.

Format
The series took place in front of the little barn made from popsicle sticks on top of a long tabletop, that sometimes extended out to other settings, such as a large crater where eggs from outer space landed.

PJ Katie voiced all of the animals.

Music
The theme song was sung by Racicot herself, and most episodes were introduced with her yelling "You are here for PJKTYSFRMPJKTYSFRMPJKTYSFRM!".

Theme song lyrics
On Katie's Farm, imagination's the rule,
Dippe the cat, so calm and cool;
Demi and Darci and Ed come along,
Delilah the Cow she's everyone's mom;
Bryce the Collie barks and runs free,
while Blue the Horse naps under a tree;
Percival pig just squeals all the time!
Rosebeekee hamster whiiiines!
Join the gang for adventures and fun,
Katie's farm is for everyone!''

Rights bought by Nelvana
In 1998, Nelvana bought distribution rights to the entire series. However, they have not distributed the series since then.

References

External links
 YTV.com PJ Katie's Farm website (ARCHIVED)
 Unofficial Episode Guide
 

1990s Canadian children's television series
YTV (Canadian TV channel) original programming